HMS Trump (pennant number P333) was a British submarine of the third group of the T class. She was built by Vickers-Armstrongs, Barrow, and launched on 25 March 1944. So far she has been the only ship of the Royal Navy (RN) to bear the name Trump. She spent the majority of her life attached to the 4th Submarine Squadron based in Australia. She was kept in service following the war and was refitted for greater underwater performance, and was the final RN submarine to be posted in Australia, departing in January 1969. She was sold off and broken up for scrap in August 1971.

Design and description
HMS Trump was one of the group three of T-class submarines. She was part of the second batch of the third group to be ordered, in 1941. The torpedo armament was the same as the earlier group two, although by the time group three was coming into service it was realised that external torpedo tubes had major problems and affected the streamlining of the boats; the external tubes were abandoned in the following . Due to expected use in tropical climates, boats of group three were equipped with freon blowers in order to deal with the increased temperatures.

Service

World War II
Trump was commissioned in July 1944. After trials and a work-up in the North Sea in mid-October she was sent to Perth in Western Australia. On arrival, she joined the 4th Submarine Squadron, supported by the depot ship . From Perth, Trump carried out four patrols before the end of the war.

During her Far East service, Trump sank the Japanese guardboat No. 15 Shosei Maru on 13 May; a Japanese sailing vessel on 24 May; and two coasters, one on 29 May and the other on 1 June. She sank a tanker on 5 June and together with her sister boat , she sank a Japanese cargo vessel on 9 August.

Also with Tiptoe, Trump carried out an attack on a convoy on 3 August. Although it was escorted by a Japanese patrol boat, they successfully sank Tencho Maru, an army cargo ship, with the sinking credited to Tiptoe.

Post war
Trump survived the war and continued in service with the Royal Navy. Trump was one of several all-welded T-class submarines rebuilt for greater underwater performance. This "Slippery T" or "Super T" conversion involved the removal of the deck gun and the replacement of the conning tower with a streamlined "fin". Extra batteries were installed below the control room and additional electric motors were accommodated by cutting through the pressure hull and adding in a new  hull section inserted aft of the control room. The gun armaments and external torpedo tubes were removed, and the bow reshaped. Trump was one of two submarines, the other being , which had the bridge incorporated into the added fin section; and was the last to undergo this conversion.

There, they operated with units of the Far East Fleet, the Royal Australian Navy, and the Royal New Zealand Navy. In June 1964, she participated in the "NEWS EX" anti-submarine exercise in the Hauraki Gulf off the coast of New Zealand.

Trump underwent refits at Cockatoo Dockyard, between January 1962 and April 1963, and again between August 1965 and October 1966. She was the final Royal Navy submarine to be on station in Australia, departing on 10 January 1969 when the 1st Australian Submarine squadron was formed from the RN 4th Submarine Squadron. Trump was scrapped at Newport from 1 August 1971.

Notes

References

External links

 

British T-class submarines of the Royal Navy
Ships built in Barrow-in-Furness
1944 ships
World War II submarines of the United Kingdom
Cold War submarines of the United Kingdom